This is a list of the main supermarket chains that currently operate within Albania. These chains are the successful leaders of the consumer goods market in the locations they operate at.

Current chains

Ceased operations
 Praktiker
 Mercator
 Carrefour
 HIPPO markets

See also

 List of shopping malls in Albania

References 

Supermarket chains
Albania